A.T. Walden (April 12, 1885 - July 2, 1965) was an American lawyer in Atlanta, Georgia who worked on many civil rights cases, campaigns for voter registration by African Americans, and building collaboration with the white power structure. In 1964 he was appointed by the mayor of Atlanta as a municipal judge, the first black judge to be appointed in the state of Georgia since Reconstruction.

Undeterred by the segregated law school in Georgia, Walden went to Michigan and earned his law degree from the University of Michigan. He returned to Georgia in 1911 to rehearse, as one of the few black lawyers in the state through the 1940s and 1950s. He played a critical role in achieving equal pay for black schoolteachers in Atlanta in 1943, filing a suit in federal court. In 1952 he represented Horace Ward in the first legal challenge to seek admission by a black student to the all-white University of Georgia Law School.

Walden became known as a southern civil rights leader, in some cases serving as a local lawyer for the NAACP in cases in which it had national leadership. From 1946 he was active in leading efforts to get blacks registered to vote in the city of Atlanta and contributed to numerous political and civic organizations. A major power broker in the city, he worked effectively with businessmen and political leaders.

Early life
Austin Thomas Walden was born in Fort Valley, Georgia on April 12, 1885. His parents, Jennie Tomlin and Jeff Walden, had been children when emancipated from slavery after the American Civil War. Walden attended segregated schools.

In 1907 Walden graduated from Atlanta University, a historically black college. Because of segregation, Walden used a Georgia "out of state scholarship" and went to Michigan. (Georgia provided scholarships to black students to attend professional and graduate schools that the state did not provide.) He earned his law degree from the University of Michigan Law School in 1911. (This practice of the state's offering scholarships because it refused to admit black residents to its segregated law schools was ruled unconstitutional in 1938 in the Gaines case.)

For a short time Walden practiced law in Macon, Georgia before he joined the US Army in 1917 with the United States entry into the Great War. Walden was commissioned as a captain and served as an assistant judge advocate. He received an honorable discharge in 1919, at which time he settled in Atlanta and began his own law practice.

In May 1918 Walden had married Mary Ellen Denner, a public school teacher from Baltimore. They had two daughters, Jenelsie and Austella.

Legal career
As an attorney Walden often represented black professionals who had been racially persecuted because of their middle-class status. In 1927, a reputable black dentist in Atlanta was beaten after riding a streetcar and refusing to get off so the driver could have a drinking party. He was charged with disorderly conduct, and A.T. Walden successfully gained the dropping of these charges.

In another case, Walden, along with A.W. Ricks, represented Dr. and Mrs. C.A. Spence, who were beaten by a streetcar conductor after a dispute over a transfer. After months at trial, the Spences were acquitted of all criminal charges. Unsatisfied with the injustice the Spences suffered, in a revolutionary turn of events, Walden and Ricks filed a civil action for damages against the streetcar company. They won damages for the Spences in the amount of $1,500.

Walden was also successful in a federal legal suit, lasting six years, which gained equal pay for black public school teachers in Atlanta in 1943. In the early 1900s, the Board of Education had raised salaries of white teachers by cutting those of blacks. The NAACP entered the continuing struggle and Walden filed suit in federal district court on behalf of a black teacher. This case signaled the acceptance of federal courts of school civil rights cases.

As one of the few black lawyers in Georgia, Walden frequently worked with the national legal team of the NAACP, led by Thurgood Marshall, when the organization became involved in a civil rights case. In 1948, while in communication with the NAACP, Walden did not get directly involved in the case of the lynching of Robert Mallard in Lyons, Georgia, as his widow had already hired an attorney. Rather than pursuing what had been described as a white mob that stopped the Mallard car and shot Mr. Mallard, the local sheriff arrested Mrs. Mallard on suspicion of murder. At the national level, the NAACP added the local law officials' inadequate investigation to its argument for federal anti-lynching legislation.

Having grown up in rural Georgia, Walden was described as having a "pragmatic civil rights" vision that was less confrontational than that of the national office of the NAACP. He approached the Mallard case strategically for the way it might play into NAACP long-term goals if the local and state governments continued their blunders.

Additionally, as part of an effort to end segregated higher education, Walden represented Horace Ward in 1952 in the first lawsuit in the state in federal court for a black seeking admission to the all-white law school at the University of Georgia. While his suit did not succeed, Ward attended and graduated from Northwestern University School of Law in Chicago. Change was coming; Ward later served as counsel for students in a 1961 suit that successfully gained them admission to the University of Georgia. He was later appointed as a federal judge.

Walden also had success in acting as the chief negotiator representing civil rights activists to desegregate lunch counters in Atlanta department and other stores. Students from local black colleges started the Atlanta sit-ins in 1960, first at train and bus stations, which dealt with interstate travel and were legally covered by the United States constitution. They moved on to Rich's Department Store in October, as it was a major downtown institution. They also opposed related discriminatory consumer practices in the stores, such as preventing blacks from trying on clothes, using common restrooms, and similar measures. After many activists were arrested, including Rev. Martin Luther King Jr., students led economic boycotts of the department stores. By September 1961, many store owners desegregated their lunch counters. In 1962, a federal court ordered desegregation of the city's public pools and parks. The federal Civil Rights Act of 1964 overturned all state laws supporting racial segregation, but changes in practices took longer to take hold.

In 1948 Walden founded and was president of the Gate City Bar Association, for African American lawyers in Atlanta.

In 1963 A.T. Walden retired as a full-time attorney, but he continued to take charity cases for free. He remained actively involved as a political leader in civil rights in the city.

Politics 
A.T. Walden started as a Republican and served as chair of the Republican Party executive committee from Georgia's 5th congressional district. As the Republican Party had declined drastically in the South following the turn of the century disenfranchisement of most blacks by state legislatures, Walden decided to participate where there was competition.

In 1940 he became a persistent and committed member of the Democratic Party. For a period, the Georgia Democrats used the white primary to exclude blacks from voting. When that was struck down by a United States Supreme Court decision in Smith v. Allwright (1944), black activists worked to register African-American voters.

Walden devoted much of his political career pursuing this objective in Atlanta after blacks were effectively enfranchised again in 1946. He became a founder and co-chair with J. W. Dobbs of the Atlanta Negro Voters League and leader of the All-Citizens Registration Committee. Block-by-block efforts helped increase the number of black registered voters from 1,800 in 1910 to 25,000 by 1939, but individual efforts routinely encountered outright discriminatory practices by white registrars. By gaining representation in the city, black voters began to get results: the city invested more money in infrastructure improvements in their neighborhoods and began to hire black policemen in 1948 for the first time.

In a sign of changing times, in 1962 Walden was elected to the State Democratic Committee of Georgia. In 1963, he was appointed as a Georgia delegate to the Democratic National Convention.  Walden, along with Leroy Johnson, were the first blacks to participate in a Georgia Democratic Convention delegation.  That year he was appointed by President John F. Kennedy as a member of the American Battle Monuments Commission.

In 1964 Walden was appointed as the first black judge in the state after Reconstruction; Atlanta Mayor Ivan Allen appointed him as an alternate judge of the municipal courts of Atlanta. In the period after passage of civil rights legislation, white conservatives left the Democratic Party and moved into the Republican Party in Georgia and other former Confederate states.

Leadership 
Throughout his life Walden was actively involved in the community and recognized for his steadfast efforts in gaining equal rights for African Americans. He was involved in a number of different organizations in which he held leadership positions including: founder and president of the Gate City Bar Association, chairman of the Executive Board of the YMCA and the Atlanta Urban League, president of the Alumni Association of Atlanta University, national vice-president of the NAACP, member of its National Legal Committee, chairman of the trustee board of Wheat Street Baptist Church, teacher of the Bryant Bible class, and founder and co-chairman of the Atlanta Negro Voters League.

Death 
A.T. Walden died in Atlanta on July 2, 1965.  He had lived long enough to witness passage of the Civil Rights Act of 1964 and introduction of the Voting Rights Act, which was passed by Congress later in 1965 and signed by President Lyndon B. Johnson. The Atlanta mayor praised Walden saying, "Much of Atlanta’s outstanding pioneer progress and better race relations was due to the effective leadership of ‘Colonel’ Walden. His Leadership laid the groundwork for much that is not an accepted fact.".

References 

African-American lawyers
20th-century American lawyers
1885 births
1965 deaths
University of Michigan Law School alumni
Clark Atlanta University alumni
20th-century African-American people